Danger Island is a live-action adventure serial produced by Hanna-Barbera and originally broadcast in 1968–69 as a segment of The Banana Splits Adventure Hour. It was filmed in Mexico, directed by future Superman, The Goonies and Lethal Weapon director Richard Donner, and featured Jan-Michael Vincent as Lincoln 'Link' Simmons.

The series comprises a six-hour adventure yarn broken down into 36 short chapters. Each chapter is roughly ten minutes long and includes a suspenseful cliffhanger ending that is resolved in the next installment. The live-action segment was created to cut production costs on the mostly-animated hour-long show.

Plot
Inspired by the animated Hanna-Barbera series Jonny Quest, Danger Island depicted the adventures of a trio of explorers in an unnamed tropical island group: Prof. Irwin Hayden, an archaeologist; Lincoln "Link" Simmons, the professor's youthful assistant; and Leslie, the professor's daughter, who serves as both a love interest for Link and the series' token damsel in distress.

Several years earlier, the professor's brother (also an archaeologist) disappeared in the same island chain while searching for the mythical lost city of Tobanya. They are joined on their quest by Morgan, a shipwrecked merchant mariner, and his sidekick Chongo, who speaks only in a series of monkey-like chatters and birdcalls. They are pursued by a group of bumbling, but heavily armed, modern-day pirates led by the murderous Captain Mu-Tan, and by three tribes of cannibal natives known as "the Headhunters", "the Skeleton Men" and "the Ash Men". The show spawned a popular catchphrase, "Uh-oh, Chongo!", among children of that time.

Characters

Main characters
Prof. Irwin Hayden – Frank Aletter
Lincoln 'Link' Simmons – Jan-Michael Vincent (as Michael Vincent)
Leslie Hayden – Ronne Troup
Elihu Morgan – Rockne Tarkington
Chongo – Kim Kahana (as Kahana)

Villains
Captain Mu-Tan – Victor Eberg
Chu – Rodrigo Arrendondo

References

The Banana Splits
1968 American television series debuts
1969 American television series endings
1968 Mexican television series debuts
1969 Mexican television series endings
1960s American children's television series
Mexican children's television series
American children's adventure television series
Mexican adventure television series
NBC original programming
Television series by Hanna-Barbera
Television shows set on islands
English-language television shows
Television series segments